Phosphatidate cytidylyltransferase (also known as CDP- diacylglycerol synthase) (CDS) is the enzyme that catalyzes the synthesis of CDP-diacylglycerol from cytidine triphosphate and phosphatidate.

CTP + phosphatidate  diphosphate + CDP-diacylglycerol

Thus, the two substrates of this enzyme are cytidine triphosphate, or CTP, and phosphatidate, whereas its two products are diphosphate and CDP-diacylglycerol.

CDP-diacylglycerol is an important branch point intermediate in both prokaryotic and eukaryotic organisms. CDS is a membrane-bound enzyme.

This enzyme belongs to the family of transferases, specifically those transferring phosphorus-containing nucleotide groups (nucleotidyltransferases). This enzyme participates in glycerophospholipid metabolism and phosphatidylinositol signaling system.

References

 
 
 

EC 2.7.7
Enzymes of unknown structure